Chazi may refer to:
 Chazi, Iran
 Cazê, Tibet